Zona Bananera is a municipality of the Magdalena Department in northern Colombia. Its main town is Prado Sevilla.

References

External links
 Zona Bananera official website
 Gobernacion del Magdalena - Zona Bananera

Municipalities of Magdalena Department